Barlow Pass may refer to one of these mountain passes in the United States:

Barlow Pass (Oregon)
Barlow Pass (Washington)